Chemokine (C-X-C motif) ligand 16 (CXCL16) is a small cytokine belonging to the CXC chemokine family.  Larger than other chemokines (with 254 amino acids), CXCL16 is composed of a CXC chemokine domain, a mucin-like stalk, a transmembrane domain and a cytoplasmic tail containing a potential tyrosine phosphorylation site that may bind SH2. These are unusual features for a chemokine, and allow CXCL16 to be expressed as a cell surface bound molecule, as well as a soluble chemokine.  CXCL16 is produced by dendritic cells found in the T cell zones of lymphoid organs, and by cells found in the  red pulp of the spleen. Cells that bind and migrate in response to CXCL16 include several subsets of T cells, and natural killer T (NKT) cells.  CXCL16 interacts with the chemokine receptor CXCR6, also known as Bonzo. Expression of CXCL16 is induced by the inflammatory cytokines IFN-gamma and TNF-alpha.  The gene for human CXCL16 is located on chromosome 17.

The administration of folinic acid, which forces the methylation of CXCL 16, induces high levels of methylation of the CXCL 16 gene promoter in colon, ileum and lung and causes iNKT cells accumulation in these tissues. Colonization of neonatal GF mice, but not in adult mice, with a conventional microbiota decreases hypermethylation levels of CXCL 16.

References

Cytokines